Edwin José Escobar (born April 22, 1992) is a Venezuelan professional baseball pitcher for the Yokohama DeNA BayStars of Nippon Professional Baseball (NPB). He has played in Major League Baseball (MLB) for the Boston Red Sox and Arizona Diamondbacks and for the Hokkaido Nippon-Ham Fighters of Nippon Professional Baseball (NPB).

Career

Texas Rangers
The Texas Rangers signed Escobar as an international free agent in 2008. He made his professional debut with the AZL Rangers in 2009, logging a 2-5 record and 5.00 ERA in 13 games.

San Francisco Giants
On April 1, 2010, Escobar was traded to the San Francisco Giants in exchange for minor leaguer Ben Snyder. He spent the season with the Low-A Salem-Keizer Volcanoes, pitching to a 2-4 record and 4.86 ERA in 14 games. The next year, Escobar split the season between the AZL Giants and the Single-A Augusta GreenJackets, accumulating a 3-7 record and 6.58 ERA in 52.0 innings of work. In 2012, he returned to Augusta, pitching to a 7-8 record and 2.96 ERA with 122 strikeouts in 130.2 innings pitched.

The Giants added Escobar to their 40-man roster after the 2012 season. He split the 2013 season between the High-A San Jose Giants and the Double-A Richmond Flying Squirrels, posting a 8-8 record and 2.80 ERA in 26 appearances between the two teams. He began the 2014 season with the Triple-A Fresno Grizzlies, and logged a 3-8 record and 5.11 ERA in 20 games.

Boston Red Sox
The Giants traded Escobar and Heath Hembree to the Boston Red Sox in exchange for Jake Peavy on July 26, 2014. He was called up to the Red Sox on August 10, and returned to the Triple-A Pawtucket Red Sox the next day. Escobar was recalled on August 27, 2014, and pitched a scoreless 8th inning in his Major League debut in Toronto against the Toronto Blue Jays. He finished his rookie season with a 4.50 ERA in 2 appearances. In 2015, Escobar spent the majority of the season in Triple-A Pawtucket, also playing in 1 game for the Single-A Greenville Drive, and pitched to a 3-3 record and 4.97 ERA in 20 games. He was assigned to Pawtucket to begin the 2016 season. Escobar was designated for assignment on April 20, 2016, to make room on the active roster for William Cuevas.

Arizona Diamondbacks
On April 29, 2016, Escobar was claimed off waivers by the Arizona Diamondbacks and optioned to the Triple-A Reno Aces. The Diamondbacks promoted Escobar to the major leagues to make his first major league start on May 30, 2016. In 25 games for Arizona, Escobar recorded a 7.23 ERA with 17 strikeouts in 23.2 innings pitched.

Cleveland Indians
On November 18, 2016, the Cleveland Indians claimed Escobar off waivers. Escobar was designated for assignment on January 5, 2017 to make room on the 40-man roster for Edwin Encarnación. He was released on January 10, to pursue a pitching opportunity in Japan.

Hokkaido Nippon-Ham Fighters
On January 11, 2017, Escobar signed a one-year, $775,000 with the Hokkaido Nippon-Ham Fighters of Nippon Professional Baseball. In 14 games for the Fighters, Escobar registered a 5.64 ERA in 22.1 innings of work.

Yokohama DeNA BayStars
On July 7, 2017, Escobar was traded to the Yokohama DeNA BayStars for catcher Toshiki Kurobane. The BayStars re-signed him in the offseason to a one year deal worth roughly $500,000.  He finished the 2017 season with a 3.44 ERA in 27 games for the BayStars. In 2018, Escobar pitched in 53 games for the team, posting a 4-3 record and 3.57 ERA with 54 strikeouts in 53.0 innings pitched. Escobar agreed to another 1-year contract with the BayStars for the 2019 season worth roughly $854,000. That season, Escobar pitched to a 5-4 record and 2.51 ERA with 88 strikeouts in 74 appearances. On November 18, 2019, Escobar signed a 1-year extension, worth roughly $1.5 million, to remain with the BayStars. In 2020, Escobar logged a 1-4 record and 2.33 ERA with 58 strikeouts in 54.0 innings pitched across 56 games.

Personal life
Escobar is son of shortstop José Escobar, as well as cousin of shortstop Alcides Escobar, and pitchers Kelvim Escobar and Vicente Campos.

See also
 List of Major League Baseball players from Venezuela

References

External links

1992 births
Living people
Arizona Diamondbacks players
Arizona League Giants players
Arizona League Rangers players
Augusta GreenJackets players
Boston Red Sox players
Cardenales de Lara players
Edwin
Fresno Grizzlies players
Greenville Drive players
Hokkaido Nippon-Ham Fighters players
Major League Baseball pitchers
Major League Baseball players from Venezuela
Nippon Professional Baseball pitchers
Salem-Keizer Volcanoes players
San Jose Giants players
Pawtucket Red Sox players
People from Vargas (state)
Reno Aces players
Richmond Flying Squirrels players
Yokohama DeNA BayStars players
Venezuelan expatriate baseball players in Japan
Venezuelan expatriate baseball players in the United States